Mehdi Attar-Ashrafi  (Persian: مهدی عطار اشرفی‎; 23 December 1948 – 9 January 2021) was an Iranian middleweight weightlifter. He won a bronze medal at the 1974 Asian Games and a silver at the 1979 Asian Championships and competed at the 1976 Summer Olympics.

References

1948 births
2021 deaths
Iranian male weightlifters
Olympic weightlifters of Iran
Weightlifters at the 1976 Summer Olympics
Medalists at the 1974 Asian Games
Asian Games silver medalists for Iran
Asian Games bronze medalists for Iran
Weightlifters at the 1974 Asian Games
Asian Games medalists in weightlifting
20th-century Iranian people